Juan José Pizzuti (9 May 1927 – 24 January 2020) was an Argentine football player and manager. A striker, he enjoyed his most notable successes as player and manager with Racing Club de Avellaneda.

Pizzuti was born in the Barracas neighbourhood of Buenos Aires and joined the Banfield youth team at the age of 14.

Playing career

Pizzuti made his breakthrough into the Banfield first team in 1947 at the age of 19. He became the top scorer in the Argentine league in 1949, this brought him to the attention of several major clubs and he eventually signed for River Plate in 1951.

In 1952, after only one season with River, Pizzuti left to join Racing Club de Avellaneda, he became the topscorer in the Argentine league for a second time in 1953.

In 1955 Pizzuti joined Boca Juniors, making him one of a select band of players to have played for both River Plate and Boca Juniors, he only played 20 games that season and returned to Racing Club in 1956.

Pizzuti was part of a championship winning team for the first time in 1958, and Racing won the title again in 1961. Pizzuti then returned to Boca Juniors where he won his third and last league title as a player in 1962. He retired as a player in 1963, by the end of his career he had scored a total of 182 goals in 349 games, to make him one of the top 20 all time goalscorers in the Argentine league.

International career
Pizzuti played for Argentina between 1951 and 1959, he was part of the squad for the South American Championship in 1959 where he scored three goals to help them to win the title.

Titles as a player

Managerial career
Pizzuti took over as the manager of Racing Club in 1965, he led them to the Argentine league championship in 1966 and then saw his team defeat Nacional of Uruguay in the 1967 Copa Libertadores. Racing Club then added to their international success by defeating Celtic F.C. of Scotland to win the Copa Intercontinental and become the first Argentine team to become club champions of the world. Pizzuti left Racing Club in 1969 after four years and four months in charge, which still stands as the longest managerial reign at the club.

Pizzuti was manager of the Argentina national team between 1970 and 1972, taking the team to fourth place at the Brazilian Independence Cup. The third place decider there, which Argentina lost 2-4 to Yugoslavia, was his last match at the helm of the national side. He had spells as manager of Nueva Chicago in Argentina and Independiente Medellín in Colombia amongst other positions.

Titles as a manager

References

External links

 

1927 births
2020 deaths
Footballers from Buenos Aires
Argentine footballers
Argentina international footballers
Association football forwards
Club Atlético Banfield footballers
Club Atlético River Plate footballers
Racing Club de Avellaneda footballers
Boca Juniors footballers
Argentine Primera División players
Argentine football managers
Argentina national football team managers
Racing Club de Avellaneda managers
Nueva Chicago managers
Independiente Medellín managers
Copa América-winning players
Club Atlético Colón managers